Odobescu is a Romanian surname. Notable people with the surname include:

Alexandru Odobescu (1834–1895), Romanian author, archaeologist, and politician
Anna Odobescu (born 1991), Moldovan singer and actress
Vasile Odobescu (died 1953), Moldovan activist

Romanian-language surnames